Roy P. Drachman-Agua Caliente Regional Park is a  regional park in northeastern Tucson, Arizona.

History
In 1984 Roy P. Drachman donated over $200,000 to Pima County towards the purchase of the property.

References

Parks in Pima County, Arizona
Geography of Tucson, Arizona
Tourist attractions in Tucson, Arizona